Brothers in Arms: Art of War is a game developed and published by Gameloft for mobile phones, based on Gearbox's Brothers in Arms series.

Gameplay

Art of War is chiefly a top-down shooter, featuring 13 missions in 3 campaigns, including Operation Market Garden. The game also includes parachute missions, rail shooter plane, tank and boat missions, as well as a destructible environment.

Reception
Art of War received a score of 4 out of 5 from Pocket Gamer.

References

External links
Official site
Gameloft

2008 video games
Brothers in Arms (video game series)
Java platform games
Gameloft games
Mobile games
North America-exclusive video games
Video games developed in France